Cobitis is a genus of small freshwater fish in the family Cobitidae from temperate and subtropical Eurasia. It contains the "typical spiny loaches", including the well-known spined loach of Europe. Similar spiny loaches, occurring generally south of the range of Cobitis, are nowadays separated in Sabanejewia.

Species
There are currently 96 recognized species in this genus:
 Cobitis amphilekta Vasil'eva & Vasil'ev, 2012 (Khvalyn spined loach) 
 Cobitis arachthosensis Economidis & Nalbant, 1996
 Cobitis arenae (S. Y. Lin, 1934)
 Cobitis australis Y. X. Chen, Y. F. Chen & D. K. He, 2013 
 Cobitis avicennae Mousavi-Sabet, Vatandoust, Esmaeili, Geiger & Freyhof, 2015 (Zagros spined loach) 
 Cobitis baishagensis Y. X. Chen, X. Y. Sui, N. Liang & Y. F. Chen, 2015 
 Cobitis battalgili Băcescu, 1962 (Battalgil's spined loach)
 Cobitis bilineata Canestrini, 1865
 Cobitis bilseli Battalgil, 1942 (Beyşehir spined loach)
 Cobitis biwae D. S. Jordan & Snyder, 1901
 Cobitis brevifasciata (I. S. Kim & W. O. Lee, 1995) 
 Cobitis calderoni  Băcescu, 1962
 Cobitis choii I. S. Kim & Y. M. Son, 1984 (Choi's spined loach)
 Cobitis crassicauda Y. X. Chen & Y. F. Chen, 2013 
 Cobitis dalmatina S. L. Karaman, 1928
 Cobitis damlae Erk' Akan & Özdemir, 2014 (Dalaman spined loach) 
 Cobitis delicata Niwa, 1937 
 Cobitis dolichorhynchus Nichols, 1918
 Cobitis dorademiri Erk' Akan, Özdemir & Özeren, 2017 
 Cobitis elazigensis Coad & Sarıeyyüpoglu, 1988 (Tigris spined loach)
 Cobitis elongata Heckel & Kner, 1857
 Cobitis elongatoides Băcescu & R. F. Mayer, 1969
 Cobitis evreni Erk' Akan, Özeren & Nalbant, 2008 (Ceyhan spined loach)
 Cobitis fahireae Erk' Akan, Ekmekçi & Nalbant, 1998 (Küçük Menderes spined loach)
 Cobitis faridpaki Mousavi-Sabet, Vasil'eva, Vatandoust & Vasil'ev, 2011 
 Cobitis fasciola Y. X. Chen & Y. F. Chen, 2013 
 Cobitis gracilis Y. X. Chen & Y. F. Chen, 2016 
 Cobitis guttatus (V. H. Nguyễn, 2005)
 Cobitis hankugensis I. S. Kim, J. Y. Park, Y. M. Son & Nalbant, 2003
 Cobitis hellenica Economidis & Nalbant, 1996
 Cobitis hereromacula Y. X. Chen, X. Y. Sui, N. Liang & Y. F. Chen, 2015 
 Cobitis herzegoviniensis Buj & Šanda, 2014 
 Cobitis hugowolfeldi (Nalbant, 1993) 
 Cobitis illyrica Freyhof & Stelbrink, 2007
 Cobitis jadovaensis Mustafić & Mrakovčić, 2008
 Cobitis kaibarai Nakajima, 2012 
 Cobitis kellei Erk' Akan, Ekmekçi & Nalbant, 1998 (Göksu spined loach)
 Cobitis koreensis I. S. Kim, 1975 
 Cobitis laoensis (Sauvage, 1878)
 Cobitis laterimaculata J. P. Yan & M. L. Zheng, 1984 
 Cobitis lebedevi Vasil'eva & Vasil'ev, 1985
 Cobitis levantina Krupp & Moubayed-Breil, 1992 (Orontes spined loach)
 Cobitis linea (Heckel, 1847)
 Cobitis longibarba (Y. F. Chen & Y. X. Chen, 2005) 
 Cobitis longicorpus I. S. Kim, K. C. Choi & Nalbant, 1976 
 Cobitis lutheri Rendahl (de), 1935 (Luther's spined loach) 
 Cobitis macrostigma Dabry de Thiersant, 1872
 Cobitis magnostriata Nakajima, 2012 
 Cobitis maroccana Pellegrin, 1929
 Cobitis matsubarai Okada & Ikeda, 1939
 Cobitis megaspila Nalbant, 1993
 Cobitis melanoleuca Nichols, 1925
 Cobitis meridionalis S. L. Karaman, 1924
 Cobitis microcephala Y. X. Chen & Y. F. Chen, 2011 
 Cobitis minamorii Nakajima, 2012 
 Cobitis minhi S. V. Ngô, 2008
 Cobitis multifasciata Wakiya & T. Mori, 1929 
 Cobitis multimaculata Y. X. Chen & Y. F. Chen, 2011 
 Cobitis nalbanti Vasil'eva, D. M. Kim, Vasil'ev, M. H. Ko & Y. J. Won, 2016 (Nalbant's spined loach) 
 Cobitis narentana S. L. Karaman, 1928
 Cobitis ohridana S. L. Karaman, 1928
 Cobitis pacifica I. S. Kim, J. Y. Park & Nalbant, 1999 
 Cobitis paludica (F. de Buen, 1930)
 Cobitis phrygica Battalgazi, 1944 (Acı spined loach)
 Cobitis pontica Vasil'eva & Vasil'ev, 2006 (Pontic spined loach)
 Cobitis pumila I. S. Kim & W. O. Lee, 1987 (Puan spined loach) 
 Cobitis puncticulata Erk' Akan, Ekmekçi & Nalbant, 1998 (Spotted spined loach)
 Cobitis punctilineata	Economidis & Nalbant, 1996
 Cobitis rara J. X. Chen, 1981
 Cobitis sakahoko Nakajima & Suzawa, 2015 
 Cobitis saniae Eagderi, Jouladeh-Roudbar, Jalili, Sayyadzadeh & Esmaeili, 2017 
 Cobitis satunini Gladkov, 1935
 Cobitis shikokuensis Suzawa, 2006
 Cobitis sibirica Gladkov, 1935
 Cobitis simplicispina Hankó (hu), 1925 (Sakarya spined loach)
 Cobitis sinensis Sauvage & Dabry de Thiersant, 1874 (Siberian spined loach)
 Cobitis sipahilerae Erk' Akan, Özdemir & Özeren, 2017 
 Cobitis splendens Erk' Akan, Ekmekçi & Nalbant, 1998 (Splendid spined loach)
 Cobitis stenocauda Y. X. Chen & Y. F. Chen, 2013 
 Cobitis stephanidisi Economidis, 1992
 Cobitis striata Ikeda, 1936 
 Cobitis strumicae S. L. Karaman, 1955 (Bulgarian spined loach)
 Cobitis taenia Linnaeus, 1758 (Spined loach)
 Cobitis takatsuensis Mizuno, 1970
 Cobitis takenoi Nakajima, 2016 
 Cobitis tanaitica Băcescu & R. F. Mayer, 1969
 Cobitis taurica Vasil'eva, Vasil'ev, Janko, Ráb & Rábová, 2005
 Cobitis tetralineata I. S. Kim, J. Y. Park & Nalbant, 1999
 Cobitis trichonica Stephanidis, 1974
 Cobitis turcica Hankó (hu), 1925 (Turkish spined loach)
 Cobitis vardarensis S. L. Karaman, 1928 (Vardar spined loach)
 Cobitis vettonica Doadrio & Perdices, 1997
 Cobitis xinjiangensis (Y. F. Chen & Y. X. Chen, 2005)  
 Cobitis ylengensis S. V. Ngô, 2003
 Cobitis yongdokensis (I. S. Kim & J. Y. Park, 1997) 
 Cobitis zanandreai Cavicchioli, 1965
 Cobitis zhejiangensis Y. M. Son & S. P. He, 2005

References

 
Freshwater fish genera
Freshwater fish of Asia
Freshwater fish of Europe
Taxa named by Carl Linnaeus
Taxonomy articles created by Polbot